Waknaghat is a small town in Solan district in the Indian state of Himachal Pradesh which falls on the way to Shimla, India from Kalka, India. It is located on National Highway 22. Other nearby villages and towns are Wakna, Domehar, Aanji-Sunara, Sabathu, Mamlig, Shoghi and Kandaghat, Dhyari PG FOR BOYS BAHRA UNIVERSITY  . Nearby railway stations include Kaithli-Ghat,  from Waknaghat, and Kandaghat,  from Waknaghat.

Regional resources
Waknaghat lies in the middle of a very resourceful region. It is surrounded by agricultural land, and holds the Sabzi Mandi of Solan. Waknaghat is known for tomato, ginger, peas, cauliflower, capsicum, cabbage, lady finger, beans, pepper, pahari potato, kheera as well as stone fruits.

Waknaghat has lime and sand quarries as well as stone mines. Waknaghat also has sweet mineral water in and around it.

Geography

Climate
Lying in the middle of the Solan - Shimla segment of N.H.-22 it has a moderate set of conditions; i.e., neither so cold as Shimla, nor too hot as Kalka as the temperature hardly rises above . During winters Waknaghat experiences little snowfall.

Geology
Dagshai - Solan - Kandaghat - Waknaghat - Kaithlighat - Taradevi - Kareru - Shimla is the main ridge forming partition line between the Sutlej and Yamuna catchments. Thus a drop of rain falling on the eastern past of Karol hill ultimately goes into the Bay of Bengal whereas the drop falling on the western part ultimately leads to the Arabian Sea.

Transport

By road
Waknaghat is easily accessible by road.

The National Highway No. 22 is a prominent road passing through Waknaghat town. It is an important road from many points of view. Firstly it is a defence road connecting Delhi, Dehradun, Ambala and Chandigarh to the China Border. In addition, all raw products, building materials, passengers, goods etc. come through this route only. It is on account of its significance that there are today 2 bypasses within Solan Planning Area. 
The Centre Government is also likely to undertake the 4-laning of this road. Surveys and studies have been completed in this regard.
Besides N.H.-22, there are many other significant roads connecting Solan to its nearby areas, towns or settlements. These include:
Waknaghat - Subhatu road.
Waknaghat - Wakna Village Road.
Waknaghat - Solan- Shimla (NH-22).

By rail
The Kalka-Shimla Railway is included in the UNESCO World Heritage List.

By air
The Himachal Pradesh government is setting up its first international airport at an investment of Rs.1,000 crore in Solan district of the state on a public private partnership model.

Education
Post-secondary educational facilities include the Jaypee University of Information Technology. There is one private university in the city, Bahra University.

References

Cities and towns in Solan district